The 2022–23 Austrian Football Bundesliga, also known as Admiral Bundesliga for sponsorship reasons, is the 111th season of top-tier football in Austria. Red Bull Salzburg are the nine-times defending champions. The season began on 22 July 2022. The regular season scheduled for November was postponed until the conclusion of the 2022 FIFA World Cup. The league resumed on 10 February.

Teams

Changes
Admira Wacker Mödling were relegated to the 2022–23 Austrian Football Second League after finishing in last place in the 2021–22 Relegation Round, ending their eleven-year stay in the top flight. Austria Lustenau were promoted, after a twenty-two year hiatus, as champions of the 2021–22 Austrian Football Second League.

Stadia and locations

Personnel and kits

Note: Flags indicate national team as has been defined under FIFA eligibility rules. Players may hold more than one non-FIFA nationality.

Regular season

League table

Results

Results by round

Positions by round

Placement Progression

Championship round 
The points obtained during the regular season were halved (and rounded down) before the start of the playoff. As a result, the teams started with the following points before the playoff: Red Bull Salzburg 27, Sturm Graz 24, LASK 19, Austria Wien 16, Rapid Wien 16, and Austria Klagenfurt 15. The points of Red Bull Salzburg and Rapid Wien were rounded down – in the event of any ties on points at the end of the playoffs, a half point will be added for these teams.

Relegation round 
The points obtained during the regular season were halved (and rounded down) before the start of the playoff. As a result, the teams started with the following points before the playoff: Tirol 14, Lustenau 13, Wolfsberg 10, Hartberg 9, Ried 9, and Rheindorf Altach 8. The points of Lustenau, Hartberg and Rheindorf Altach were rounded down – in the event of any ties on points at the end of the playoffs, a half point will be added for these teams.

Statistics

Top scorers

Hat-tricks

Top assists

Discipline

Player
 Most yellow cards: 7
 Jusuf Gazibegović (Sturm Graz)
 Branko Jovičić (LASK)

 Most red cards: 1
12 players

Club
 Most yellow cards: 44
Austria Klagenfurt

 Most red cards: 2
LASK
Rapid Wien
SV Ried

 Fewest yellow cards: 27
Wolfsberger AC

 Fewest red cards: 0
Austria Klagenfurt
Rheindorf Altach
Sturm Graz
Wolfsberger AC

References

Austrian Football Bundesliga seasons
Aus
1
Current association football seasons